Cockercombe is a hamlet within the civil parish of West Bagborough in the Somerset West and Taunton district of Somerset, England, approximately  northwest by road from the centre of Taunton. It contains the Grade II listed Mill Cottage and a Forestry Office.

Geography and geology
It is just to the south of West Bagborough, southeast of Treble's Holford and northeast of Combe Florey, off the A358 road. The Cockercombe Stream flows in the vicinity. Upstream, the steam crosses between Pepper Hill and Plainsfield.

Cockercombe tuff, a greenish-grey, hard sedimentary rock, is only found in this area.

Landmarks
The Forestry Commission has an office in Cockercombe. Mill Cottage is a Grade II listed thatched cottage in the hamlet, which was originally built in the early 17th century. It was restored to acclaim in 1998 following a fire and has a new thatched roof. The cottage overlooks the Mill stream. The house is set in about 4.17 acres and has a wooden stable block with three stables.

Recreation
Mountain biking events are held in the area. The Cockercombe Hill Climb was hosted by Somerset Road Club on Sunday 8 September 2019.

References

Villages in West Somerset